P. K. Smith (September 21, 1917 – March 25, 1983) was an American politician. He served as a Democratic member of the Louisiana House of Representatives.

Life and career 
Smith was born in Winnfield, Louisiana. He was a businessperson and the owner of the Huey Long Motel.

In 1960, Smith was elected to the Louisiana House of Representatives, succeeding Ashton B. Collier. He served until 1964, when he was succeeded by Collier.

Smith died in March 1983 at the Humana Hospital-Winn Parish, at the age of 65.

References 

1917 births
1983 deaths
People from Winnfield, Louisiana
Democratic Party members of the Louisiana House of Representatives
20th-century American politicians
Long family